Goryń may refer to:

Places 
Goryń, Kuyavian-Pomeranian Voivodeship (north-central Poland)
Goryń, Łódź Voivodeship (central Poland)
Goryń, Masovian Voivodeship (east-central Poland)
Goryń, Warmian-Masurian Voivodeship (north Poland)

Music 
 Goryń (singing group) - Belarusian singing group

See also 
Horyn (disambiguation)